Raja Azlan Muzzaffar Shah Ibni Sultan Nazrin Muizzuddin Shah is the Raja Kecil Besar of Perak and as such he is the third-in-line to the throne of the Malaysian state of Perak.

References 

Royal House of Perak
Malaysian people of Arab descent
Malaysian people of English descent
Malaysian people of Thai descent
Malaysian people of Malay descent
Living people
2008 births
Sons of monarchs